New Zealand is a major skiing destination in the Southern Hemisphere, due to its high latitude, mountainous terrain, and well-developed economy and tourism industry. The ski season in New Zealand starts in mid June and in good winters can run through to the start of November.

Most of the skifields are in the South Island, with four in the North Island. There are both major commercial resorts, and smaller intrepid and club skifields which provide access to affordable skiing for club members. There are also specialist backcountry skiing areas such as Mount Potts and Invincible Snowfields which provide heliskiing and snowcat skiing for adventure-seekers.

New Zealand has competed at most Winter Olympics since 1952, when Sir Roy McKenzie led a team. In 1992 Annelise Coberger became the first person from the Southern Hemisphere to win a medal at the Winter Olympics when she won silver in the slalom at Albertville in France.

Other forms of skiing that New Zealand is known for include heli-skiing and kite-skiing. Snow-kiting, while a relative new sport, has an avid following in New Zealand, with a festival in Wanaka held annually.

It lies in the Southern Alps / Kā Tiritiri o te Moana, the mountain range which runs the length of the South Island; it is a popular tourist destination.

Gallery

See also
List of ski areas and resorts in New Zealand
Club skifield

References